The Tygerberg is an apartment highrise complex in Tudhope Avenue, Berea, Johannesburg, South Africa. It is 25 storeys tall. It overlooks Ponte Tower and Ellis Park Stadium. It is located near the Ponte City Apartments building.

The Tygerberg was designed by architect Daniel Hattingh. It houses 228 apartments over 23 floors. It is currently managed by PAL Property Management.

References 
 Amethyst: Johannesburg Landmarks. Retrieved 11 February 2008.

Skyscrapers in Johannesburg
Residential skyscrapers in South Africa